Maselino Francis Masoe Fao (born June 6, 1966 in Apia, Western Samoa) is a retired Samoan boxer who represented American Samoa at three Olympics starting with the 1988 Summer Olympics. As a professional, Masoe made history becoming the first Samoan boxer to win a major world title, defeating Kenyan born Evans Ashira on May 1, 2004 for the regular WBA world middleweight crown via second round Technical Knockout. He is the brother of rugby player Chris Masoe. Another brother, Mika, also represented American Samoa in boxing at the 1988 and 1992 Olympics.

Amateur highlights 
Represented American Samoa as a Welterweight at the 1988 Summer Olympic Games at Seoul. His results were:
Round of 64: Defeated Pedro Fria (Dominican Republic) referee stopped contest in first round 
Round of 32: Defeated Fidele Mohinga (Central African Republic) referee stopped contest in second round
Round of 16: Lost to Kenneth Gould (United States) by decision, 0-5

Competed as a Light Middleweight for American Samoa in the 1992 Summer Olympic Games at Barcelona. Results were:
Defeated Hiroshi Nagashima (Japan) RSCI-3 (00:54)
Defeated Furas Hashim (Iraq) RSCH-1 (00:44)
Lost to György Mizsei (Hungary) on points, 3-17

Competed as a Light Middleweight for American Samoa in the 1996 Summer Olympic Games at Atlanta. Results were:
Lost to Mohamed Marmouri (Tunisia) on points, 8-11

Pro career
Masoe moved to New Zealand where he began his pro career in 1997 and captured the Vacant WBA Middleweight Title by upsetting undefeated Evans Ashira in 2004.  He lost the title to Felix Sturm in 2006.

Professional titles won
Oceanic Boxing Association middleweight title (1998) 159 Ibs
IBF Pan Pacific middleweight title (1998) 158 Ibs
WBA - PABA middleweight title (2001) 160 Ibs
WBA regular World middleweight crown (2004) 159 Ibs
New Zealand National Boxing Federation super middleweight title (2008) 167 Ibs
WBO Asia Pacific super middleweight title (2008) 166 Ibs

Professional boxing record

Awards and recognitions
2019 Gladrap Boxing Hall of fame

References

External links
 

|-

New Zealand world boxing champions
1966 births
Living people
Sportspeople from Apia
American Samoan male boxers
New Zealand professional boxing champions
Middleweight boxers
Welterweight boxers
Boxers at the 1988 Summer Olympics
Boxers at the 1992 Summer Olympics
Boxers at the 1996 Summer Olympics
Olympic boxers of American Samoa
Boxers trained by Kevin Barry
World Boxing Association champions